Kaleidoscope is the fourth studio album by Dutch DJ and record producer Tiësto, released on 6 October 2009 by Musical Freedom, Tiësto's new label in association with PIAS Recordings. The album contains collaborations with Nelly Furtado, Emily Haines of Metric, Tegan and Sara, Jónsi of Sigur Rós, Kele Okereke of Bloc Party, and Calvin Harris among others.

The album also features the song "I Will Be Here" with Australian group Sneaky Sound System, which was released as the lead single on 28 July 2009. This album marks the change in Tiesto's style from trance towards more commercial house, dance and pop. The album entered the Dutch Albums Chart at number 2. It also debuted at number 20 on the UK Albums Chart and at number 5 on the Irish and Mexican Albums Chart.

Track listing

Charts

See also
 Kaleidoscope World Tour
 Kaleidoscope: Remixed

References

External links
 Tiesto.com

2009 albums
Tiësto albums
Albums produced by Danja (record producer)
Albums produced by DJ Frank E